Solapur–Bijapur Express is an intercity train of the Indian Railways connecting  in Maharashtra and  of Karnataka. It is currently being operated with 11031/11032 train numbers on a daily basis.

Service

The 11031/Solapur–Bijapur Express has an average speed of 51 km/hr and covers 109.8 km in 2 hrs 10 mins. 11032/Bijapur–Solapur Express has an average speed of 39 km/hr and 110 km in 2 hrs 50 mins.

Route and halts 

The important halts of the train are:

Coach composition

The train consists of 12 coaches:

 1 AC First-class
 2 AC III Tier
 4 Sleeper coaches
 4 General
 2 Second-class Luggage/parcel van

Traction

Both trains are hauled by a Pune Loco Shed-based WDM-3D diesel locomotive from Solapur to Bijapur.

Rake sharing 

This train shares a with 22139/22140 Solapur–Mumbai CST Express.

Notes

External links 

 11031/Solapur–Vijayapura Express
 11032/Vijayapur–Solapur Express

References 

Express trains in India
Rail transport in Maharashtra
Rail transport in Karnataka
Transport in Solapur
Railway services introduced in 2015